District School No. 7, also known as "The Little Red Schoolhouse", is an historic one-room school building located at Coeymans Hollow in Albany County, New York.  It was built in 1879 and is a single-story, rectangular brick building, three bays by three bays in the Italianate style.  It features a shingle-clad gable roof surmounted by an open belfry.  It features overhanging roof eaves and ornate door and window hood molds.  School use ceased in 1957.  It houses the Little Red Schoolhouse Historical Society.

It was listed on the National Register of Historic Places in 1996.

References

School buildings on the National Register of Historic Places in New York (state)
School buildings completed in 1879
History museums in New York (state)
Schools in Albany County, New York
National Register of Historic Places in Albany County, New York